John Clotworthy Talbot Foster Whyte-Melville-Skeffington, 13th Viscount Massereene and 6th Viscount Ferrard DL (22 October 1914 – 27 December 1992) was a British politician and landowner. He was also Baron of Loughneagh (1660, Ireland), 6th Baron Oriel (1790, Ireland), and 6th Baron Oriel (1821, UK), and served as a Deputy Lieutenant for County Antrim. He succeeded his father in 1956 and regularly attended the House of Lords.

Early years

Educated at Eton College, in 1939 Whyte-Melville-Skeffington married Annabelle Kathleen, daughter of the late Henry D. Lewis, of Combwell Priory, Kent. They had one son, the future 14th Viscount and one daughter.

He was a lieutenant in the Black Watch regiment 1933–36, and again in 1939, invalided out in 1940 due to wounds received in action. He served in the Small Vessels Pool, Royal Navy, in 1944. He was Gold Staff Officer at the Coronation of Queen Elizabeth II in 1953.

Political activities

Viscount Masserene and Ferrard was President of Brighton Kemptown Conservative Association, and Vice-President and Treasurer of the Ashford, Kent, Conservative Division. He was a member of the Inter-Parliamentary Union Delegation to Spain in 1960, and Commodore of the House of Lords Yacht Club, 1972 - 1985. He was Joint Deputy Chairman (1965 - 1970) and Whip of the Conservative Peers Committee (IUP) in the House of Lords 1965 - 1970.

Lord Masserene and Ferrard was responsible for introducing to Parliament the Deer Act in 1963, the Export of Animals for Research Bill 1968, the Riding Establishments Act 1970, the Valerie Mary Hill and Alan Monk (Marriage Enabling) Bill 1984, and moved debates on Overseas Information Services and other matters. He was Commissioner to the Hunterston Ore Terminal Hearing, Glasgow, 1973. In 1976, he was on the parliamentary delegation to Malawi, and the same year served on the Parliamentary Select committee on the Anglian Water Authority Bill.

He was for over twenty years an active member of the Conservative Monday Club. In 1981, he succeeded the 6th Marquess of Salisbury as Club President, a post he held until January 1991, when he stood down.

Business and other activities

Lord Massereene was the driver of the leading British car in the Le Mans Grand Prix D'endurance in 1937, and promoted the first scheduled air service between Glasgow-Oban-Isle of Mull, 1968. He was a Freeman of the City of London, and a liveryman of the Shipwrights' Company. He was one of the original pioneers in the commercial development of Cape Canaveral, and a director of numerous companies.

He was for some time a member of the Senechal Council of Canterbury Cathedral, a member of the Royal Yacht Squadron, and a Vice-President of the Kent branch of the Royal British Legion. He was also chairman of the Victoria League, Kent.

Estates

A very extensive landowner, his English seat was at Chilham Castle, Kent. The Norman Keep of the Castle, which is the oldest building in the village and still inhabited, dates from 1174 and was said to have been built for King Henry II. But archaeological excavations carried out in the 1920s suggest that it stands on the foundations of a much older Anglo-Saxon fortification, possibly dating from the 5th century, and there is evidence of earlier Roman habitation in the vicinity.

The Jacobean building, now known as the Castle, was constructed in 1616 for Sir Dudley Digges, reputedly to a design by Inigo Jones. It is one of the finer mansions in the south-east and commands exceptional views across the valley of the River Stour, Kent. The gardens, originally laid out by John Tradescant the elder, were redesigned in the 18th century under the guidance of Capability Brown and include a fine terrace leading down to a fishing lake. The walls to the grounds also date from this time (1720), although the two gatehouses were only added in the 1920s 
He also owned the Knock estate on the Isle of Mull, as well as estates in Ireland, notably Antrim Castle near the Six Mile Water in county Antrim, Ulster. It was set alight in a night time raid by the Irish Republican Army (IRA) in 1922 and destroyed. Massereene was in the castle with his parents at the time. All that remains is an octagonal tower.

Publications

 Massereene & Ferrard, The Viscount, The Lords - The History of the House of Lords and its function and role in the 20th century, (Foreword by The Lord Chancellor, Quintin Hogg, Baron Hailsham of St Marylebone), London, 1973,  .

References
 Copping, Robert, The Monday Club - Crisis and After May 1975, page 25, published by the Current Affairs Information Service, Ilford, Essex, (P/B).
 Dod's Parliamentary Companion 1991, 172nd edition, London. 
 Black, A & C, Who's Who, London. (Various editions).
 The Daily Telegraph, Obituary, 29 December 1992
 The Times, Obituary, 9 January 1993

External links

1914 births
1992 deaths
Massereene, 13th
People educated at Eton College
Black Watch officers
Royal Navy officers
British Army personnel of World War II
Royal Navy officers of World War II
Deputy Lieutenants of Antrim
Conservative Party (UK) hereditary peers